Fay Pickersgill is a Jamaican diplomat who was Jamaican ambassador to China. She held the record of the longest serving Director of Tourism at the Jamaican Tourist Board holding this position for nine years (from 1994 to 2003). She was awarded the Order of Distinction (Commander Class) for her work in the tourism industry in 2001.

Education 
Pickersgill studied at the University of the West Indies (UWI) for her bachelor's degree in economics and a master's degree in accounting.

Career 
Pickersgill had a long career at the Tourist Board where she served as Director of Tourism from 1994 to 2003 becoming the first longest serving director with the board. She was appointed Jamaican ambassador to China in 2015 replacing Ralph Thomas who was redeployed to Washington, DC. The Ministry of Foreign Affairs in the announcement of her appointment commented that she "is uniquely qualified to serve as Jamaica's top diplomat in Beijing". She was appointed in August 2015 and assumed duty in Beijing in November same year.

References 

Jamaican women ambassadors
University of the West Indies alumni
Year of birth missing (living people)
Living people
Ambassadors of Jamaica to China